ITV Breakfast Broadcasting Limited (previously known as GMTV Limited) is the national ITV breakfast television licensee, broadcasting in the United Kingdom. It became a wholly owned subsidiary of ITV plc in November 2009. 

GMTV, as an on-screen brand name, ended on 3 September 2010, with the newly-rebranded ITV Breakfast launching new weekday breakfast programmes Daybreak and Lorraine on 6 September 2010. In March 2014, it was announced Daybreak had been axed amid poor ratings. The programme was replaced on Monday 28 April 2014 by Good Morning Britain, reprising the title of a previous ITV's early-morning programme. The Lorraine segment has not been affected by the changes.

At weekends, ITV Breakfast airs children's programming, a simulcast of the CITV channel.

The talk show Weekend was broadcast on Saturdays and Sundays at 8:30am until 2017 when it didn't return after the Christmas break. It was hosted by Aled Jones. Various other similar talk shows have aired in this slot, including Martin & Roman's Weekend Best!.

ITV Breakfast Broadcasting Limited is a subsidiary of ITV Broadcasting Limited. The shows broadcast are produced by ITV Breakfast Ltd, a subsidiary of ITV Studios.

Programmes

Weekdays

GMTV (1993–2010)

GMTV (1993 – 2000, 2009 – 2010)

 Monday to Thursday 06:00 – 08:30 (Friday 09:25)

GMTV Newshour (1997–2009)

 Monday to Friday 06:00 – 07:00

GMTV Today (2000–2009)

 Monday to Friday 07:00 – 08:30 (Friday 09:25)

GMTV with Lorraine (2009–2010)

 Monday to Thursday 08:30 – 09:25

ITV Breakfast (2010–present)

Daybreak (2010–2014)
 06:00 – 08:30 (2010–2012)
 07:00 – 08:30 (2012–2014)

Good Morning Britain (2014–present)
06:00 – 08:30 (2014–2020)
06:00 – 09:00 (2020–present)

GMB Today (August 2017)
 08:30 – 09:25

Good Morning Britain with Lorraine (March–July 2020, December 2021)
 09:00 – 10:00

Loraine (2010–present)
 08:30 – 09:25 (2010–2020)
 09:00 – 10:00 (2020–present)

Weekends

Presenters
 A dark grey cell indicates the host did not appear that year.

Daybreak

Good Morning Britain

Current on-air team

Former on-air team

Others
Formerly, Victoria Derbyshire, Mark Durden-Smith, Julia Hartley-Brewer, Kevin Maguire, Aasmah Mir, Andrew Pierce, Adil Ray, Celia Walden, Yasmin Alibhai-Brown, Oona King, Olly Mann, Michael Portillo and Natasha Courtenay-Smith appeared on a regular basis as newspaper reviewers on Lorraine.

See also
 List of ITV Breakfast programmes
 Timeline of breakfast television in the United Kingdom
 TV-am

References

External links

 
 

 
 ITV plc

1993 establishments in the United Kingdom
 
 
ITV franchisees
ITV (TV network)
Television channels and stations established in 1993